James F. Powers (1938–2012) was a Democratic member of the New Hampshire House of Representatives, representing the Rockingham 16th District starting in 2004. He left office in 2008 for personal reasons, but returned in 2010. He died while still incumbent to his seat.

References

External links
New Hampshire House of Representatives - James Powers
Project Vote Smart - Representative James Powers (NH) profile
2006 2004

Members of the New Hampshire House of Representatives
Harvard University alumni
Boston University alumni
1938 births
2012 deaths
People from Montague, Massachusetts